Mohammad Habibul Alam (Bengali: হাবিবুল আলম, born May 15, 1950, in Dhaka, Bangladesh) served as the vice-chairman of the World Scout Committee as well as vice-president and chairman, International Committee of the Bangladesh Scouts.

In 2012, he was awarded the 334th Bronze Wolf, the only distinction of the World Organization of the Scout Movement, awarded by the World Scout Committee for exceptional services to world Scouting.

He attended Dhaka Residential Model College. He lives in Dhaka, Bangladesh.

References

External links

Recipients of the Bronze Wolf Award
Year of birth missing
Scouting and Guiding in Bangladesh